Masachika (written: 正親, 昌親, 昌央 or 政近) is a masculine Japanese given name. Notable people with the name include:

, Japanese actor and singer
, Japanese samurai
, Japanese daimyō
, Japanese sumo wrestler

Japanese masculine given names